The McReynolds House, on S. Main St. in Elkton, Kentucky, was built around 1860.  It was listed on the National Register of Historic Places in 1976.

It is a two-story three-bay brick house with a high hipped roof surmounted by a flat deck.

It is located two blocks south of the Todd County Courthouse in the center of the public square of Elkton.

References

National Register of Historic Places in Todd County, Kentucky
Houses completed in 1860
1860 establishments in Kentucky
Houses in Todd County, Kentucky
Houses on the National Register of Historic Places in Kentucky
Elkton, Kentucky